Charles Edward Gariepy (March 19, 1888 - September 3, 1976) was a Canadian politician. He was elected to the separate Catholic school board from 1929 to 1937. Gariepy was elected to be North side alderman, Edmonton City Council, Alberta, Canada 1940–1948.

Career
Gariepy was elected to a one-year term to fill the seat left by Frederick Clayton Casselman's resignation.

Gariepy was born in Montreal in 1888 to Pierre and Jeniene Gariepy. He joined the Canadian armed forces in mid 1915 and fought with the 2nd Canadian Division in France. After the signing of the treaty of Versailles he returned home and moved to Alberta to work with CN rail. He shortly later met his wife Jean Giroux.

References

Edmonton Public Library Biography of Charles Gariepy

1888 births
1976 deaths
Edmonton city councillors
Politicians from Montreal
Franco-Albertan people